The 1991–92 Cincinnati Bearcats men's basketball team represented the University of Cincinnati in NCAA Division I competition in the 1991–92 season. The Bearcats, coached by Bob Huggins, won the first title of the Great Midwest Conference, created that season by a split from the Metro Conference (the two would reunite in 1995 to form Conference USA).

Roster

Schedule

|-
!colspan=12 style=|Non-conference regular season

|-
!colspan=12 style=|Great Midwest Tournament 

|-
!colspan=12 style=|NCAA Tournament

Rankings

Team players drafted into the NBA

References

Cincinnati
Cincinnati Bearcats men's basketball seasons
NCAA Division I men's basketball tournament Final Four seasons
Cincinnati
Cincinnati Bearcats men's basketball
Cincinnati Bearcats men's basketball